More Golden Grass is the second compilation album by the American rock band The Grass Roots, released in September 1970 by Dunhill Records. It includes the #15 charting single "Temptation Eyes", the #61 charting single "Come On And Say It", and the #35 charting single "Baby Hold On". The album charted at #152.

Songs

The songs featured unique touches by arrangers Jimmie Haskell and Sid Feller. The songs reflected the group's soulful re-direction by Dunhill and the three-part harmony of the primary vocalists Entner, Grill and Provisor. Five songs from the band's composers were included. This album highlights five hits from the prior two albums Lovin' Things and Leaving It All Behind, plus three hit singles issued during 1970.  The remainder were B-sides from prior singles and two to be used on singles to be issued in 1971.  Many of these songs were re-issued on their third compilation album titled Their 16 Greatest Hits that was released the next year. Their 16 Greatest Hits would showcase hits from all five of the group's studio albums in one package and stay in print longer than any of their albums.

Artwork, packaging
The original release of More Golden Grass is on Dunhill ABC in stereo. The front cover was designed by Cal Schenkel with photography by Ed Caraeff.

Track listing
All songs produced by Steve Barri with assistance from The Grass Roots.

Side one
"Come On and Say It" (Provisor, Entner, Grill) – 2:37 
"I Can Turn Off the Rain" (Provisor) – 3:09
"Heaven Knows" (Price, Walsh) – 2:23
"The River Is Wide" (Knight, Admire) – 2:30  	
"Let It Go" (Provisor) – 3:42
"I'd Wait a Million Years" (Bottler, Zekley) – 3:19

Side two
"Temptation Eyes" (Price, Walsh) – 2:40 	
"Walking Through the Country" (Provisor) – 3:57
"Lovin' Things" (Schroeck, Loring) – 2:40
"Get It Together" (Entner, Coonce, Provisor, Grill) – 2:16	
"Baby Hold On" (Price, Walsh) – 2:42 		
"Keepin' Me Down" (Provisor) – 4:52

Personnel
The Grass Roots
Rob Grill – vocals, bass, composer
Warren Entner – guitar, vocals, composer
Dennis Provisor – piano, organ, vocals, composer
Terry Furlong – lead guitar
Rick Coonce – drums, percussion

Additional personnel
Steve Barri – producer, composer
Phil Kaye – engineer
Jimmie Haskell – arrangements
Sid Feller – arrangements

References

External links 
allmusic review

1970 compilation albums
1970 greatest hits albums
Dunhill Records compilation albums
The Grass Roots albums
Albums arranged by Jimmie Haskell
Albums arranged by Sid Feller
Albums produced by Steve Barri